The Kuwaiti Division One was introduced for the 2006/2007 season. The bottom six clubs in the 2005/2006 were competing in the Kuwaiti Division One 2006–07. Both Al Naser and Al Jahra claimed the top two spots which earned them promotion to the Kuwaiti Premier League 2007-08.

Standings

Top scorers

References

External links 
  Kuwaiti Division One

Kuwaiti Division One seasons
2006–07 in Kuwaiti football
Kuwait